The flooding of the Nile has been an important natural cycle in Egypt since ancient times. It is celebrated by Egyptians as an annual holiday for two weeks starting August 15, known as Wafaa El-Nil. It is also celebrated in the Coptic Church by ceremonially throwing a martyr's relic into the river, hence the name, The Martyr's Finger. The flooding of the Nile was poetically described in myth as Isis's tears of sorrow for Osiris when killed by his brother Set.

Flooding cycle
Most of this rainwater is taken by the Blue Nile and by the Atbarah River into the Nile, while a less important amount flows through the Sobat and the White Nile into the Nile. During this short period, those rivers contribute up to ninety percent of the water of the Nile and most of the sedimentation carried by it, but after the rainy season, dwindle to minor rivers.

The flooding as such was foreseeable, though its exact dates and levels could only be forecast on a short-term basis by transmitting the gauge readings at Aswan to the lower parts of the kingdom where the data had to be converted to the local circumstances. What was not foreseeable, of course, was the extent of flooding and its total discharge.

The Egyptian year was divided into the three seasons of Akhet (Inundation), Peret (Growth), and Shemu (Harvest). Akhet covered the Egyptian flood cycle. This cycle was so consistent that the Egyptians timed its onset using the heliacal rising of Sirius, the key event used to set their calendar.

The first indications of the rise of the river could be seen at the first of the cataracts of the Nile (at Aswan) as early as the beginning of June, and a steady increase went on until the middle of July, when the increase of water became very great. The Nile continued to rise until the beginning of September, when the level remained stationary for a period of about three weeks, sometimes a little less. In October, it often rose again and reached its highest level. From this period, it began to subside and usually sank steadily until the month of June, when it reached its lowest level again. Flooding reached Aswan about a week earlier than Cairo, and Luxor five to six days earlier than Cairo.

Agriculture

Basin irrigation
Whilst the earliest Egyptians simply laboured those areas which were inundated by the floods, some 7000 years ago, they started to develop the basin irrigation method. Agricultural land was divided into large fields surrounded by dams and dykes and equipped with intake and exit canals. The basins were flooded and then closed for about 45 days to saturate the soil with moisture and allow the silt to deposit. Then the water was discharged to lower fields or back into the Nile. Immediately thereafter, sowing started, and harvesting followed some three or four months later. In the dry season thereafter, farming was not possible. Thus, all crops had to fit into this tight scheme of irrigation and timing.

In case of a small flood, the upper basins could not be filled with water which would mean famine. If a flood was too large, it would damage villages, dykes and canals.

The basin irrigation method did not exact too much of the soils, and their fertility was sustained by the annual silt deposit. Salinisation did not occur, since, in summer, the groundwater level was well below the surface, and any salinity which might have accrued was washed away by the next flood.

It is estimated that by this method, in ancient Egypt, some 2 million up to a maximum of 12 million inhabitants could be nourished. By the end of Late Antiquity, the methods and infrastructure slowly decayed, and the population diminished accordingly; by 1800, Egypt had a population of some 2.5 million inhabitants.

Perennial irrigation
Muhammad Ali Pasha, Khedive of Egypt (r. 1805–1848), attempted to modernize various aspects of Egypt. He endeavoured to extend arable land and achieve additional revenue by introducing cotton cultivation, a crop with a longer growing season and requiring sufficient water at all times. To this end, the Delta Barrages and wide systems of new canals were built, changing the irrigation system from the traditional basin irrigation to perennial irrigation whereby farmland could by irrigated throughout the year. Thereby, many crops could be harvested twice or even three times a year and agricultural output was increased dramatically.
In 1873, Isma'il Pasha commissioned the construction of the Ibrahimiya Canal, thereby greatly extending perennial irrigation.

End of flooding

Although the British, during their first period in Egypt, improved and extended this system, it was not able to store large amounts of water and to fully retain the annual flooding. In order to further improve irrigation, Sir William Willcocks, in his role as director general of reservoirs for Egypt, planned and supervised the construction of the Aswan Low Dam, the first true storage reservoir, and the Assiut Barrage, both completed in 1902. However, they were still not able to retain sufficient water to cope with the driest summers, despite the Aswan Low Dam being raised twice, in 1907–1912 and in 1929–1933.

During the 1920s, the Sennar Dam was constructed on the Blue Nile as a reservoir in order to supply water to the huge Gezira Scheme on a regular basis. It was the first dam on the Nile to retain large amounts of sedimentation (and to divert a large quantity of it into the irrigation canals) and in spite of opening the sluice gates during the flooding in order to flush the sediments, the reservoir is assumed to have lost about a third of its storage capacity. In 1966, the Roseires Dam was added to help irrigating the Gezira Scheme. The Jebel Aulia Dam on the White Nile south of Khartoum was completed in 1937 in order to compensate for the Blue Nile's low waters in winter, but it was still not possible to overcome a period of very low waters in the Nile and thus avoid occasional drought, which had plagued Egypt since ancient times.

In order to overcome these problems, Harold Edwin Hurst, a British hydrologist in the Egyptian Public Works from 1906 until many years after his retirement age, studied the fluctuations of the water levels in the Nile, and already in 1946 submitted an elaborate plan for how a "century storage" could be achieved to cope with exceptional dry seasons occurring statistically once in a hundred years. His ideas of further reservoirs using Lake Victoria, Lake Albert and Lake Tana and of reducing the evaporation in the Sudd by digging the Jonglei Canal were opposed by the states concerned.

Eventually, Gamal Abdel Nasser, President of Egypt from 1956 to 1970, opted for the idea of the Aswan High Dam at Aswan in Egypt instead of having to deal with many foreign countries. The required size of the reservoir was calculated using Hurst's figures and mathematical methods. In 1970, with the completion of the Aswan High Dam which was able to store the highest floods, the annual flooding cycle in Egypt came to an end in Lake Nasser.

Egypt's population rose to 92.5 million (2016 estimate).

Religious beliefs 

The Nile was also an important part of ancient Egyptian spiritual life. In the Ancient Egyptian religion, Hapi was the god of the Nile and the annual flooding of it. Both he and the pharaoh were thought to control the flooding. The annual flooding of the Nile occasionally was said to be the Arrival of Hapi. Since this flooding provided fertile soil in an area that was otherwise desert, Hapi symbolised fertility.

The god Osiris was also closely associated with the Nile and the fertility of the land. During inundation festivals, mud figures of Osiris were planted with barley.

See also 
Nilometer
Egyptian Public Works
Aswan Dam#Irrigation scheme
Water supply and sanitation in Egypt
Water resources management in modern Egypt
The National Water Research Center (Egypt)

References

Citations

Bibliography
 
 William Willcocks, James Ireland Craig: Egyptian Irrigation. Volume I;  Egyptian Irrigation. Volume II. 3rd edition. Spon, London/ New York 1913.
 Greg Shapland: Rivers of Discord: International Water Disputes in the Middle East. C. Hurst & Co., London 1997, p. 57. (preview on Google books).
 John V. Sutcliffe, Yvonne P. Parks: The Hydrology of the Nile. International Association of Hydrological Sciences, Wallingford 1999, p. 151. (PDF ).

Egyptian culture
Egyptian mythology
Coptic Orthodox Church
Nile